The 2004 Montreal Alouettes finished in first place in the East Division with a franchise record 14–4 record. They appeared in the East final, but with Anthony Calvillo out with injury, they lost to the Toronto Argonauts.

Offseason

CFL draft

Preseason

Regular season

Season standings

Season schedule

Roster

Playoffs

Scotiabank East Final

Awards

2004 CFL All-Star Selections
Ben Cahoon – Slotback
Uzooma Okeke – Offensive Tackle
Paul Lambert – Offensive Guard
Bryan Chiu – Centre
Anwar Stewart – Defensive End
Almondo Curry – Cornerback

2004 CFL Eastern All-Star Selections
Anthony Calvillo – Quarterback
Ben cahoon – Slotback
Jeremaine Copeland – Slotback
Kwame Cavil – Wide Receiver
Uzooma okeke – Offensive Tackle
Scott Flory – Offensive Guard
Paul lambert – Offensive Guard
Bryan chiu – Centre
Anwar stewart – Defensive End
Ed Philion – Defensive Tackle
Kevin Johnson – Linebacker
Tim Strickland – Linebacker
Kelly Malveaux – Defensive Back
Almondo curry – Cornerback
Davis Sanchez – Cornerback

2004 Intergold CFLPA All-Star Selections

References

Montreal Alouettes
Montreal Alouettes seasons